Fever Dream(s) may refer to:

Film and television
 Fever Dream, a 1979 film by Chick Strand
 Fever Dream (film), an adaptation of Samanta Schweblin's novel (see below)
 Fever Dreams (company), a film-development division of the American company Media Blasters
 "Fever Dream" (The Spanish Princess), a 2019 television episode

Literature
 Fever Dream (Preston and Child novel), a 2010 novel by Douglas Preston and Lincoln Child
 Fever Dream (Schweblin novel), a 2014 novel by Samanta Schweblin
 "Fever Dream" (short story), a 1948 short story by Ray Bradbury
 Fever/Dream, a 2009 play by Sheila Callaghan

Music

Albums
 Fever Dream (Alias album), 2011
 Fever Dream (Ben Watt album) or the title song, 2016
 Fever Dream (Of Monsters and Men album), 2019
 Fever Dream, by Cannons, 2022
 Fever Dream, by Cover Your Tracks, 2016
 Fever Dream, by Mamaleek, 2008
 Fever Dream, by Palaye Royale, or the title song, 2022
 Fever Dream, by Richie Kotzen, 1990
 A Fever Dream, by Everything Everything, or the title song, 2017
 Fever Dreams (Johnny Marr album), 2022
 Fever Dreams (Steve Roach album), 2004
 Fever Dreams, by Mia Borders, 2016
 Fever Dreams, by Val Astaire, 2020
 Fever Dreams, by Villagers, 2021

EPs
 Fever Dream, by Young Summer, 2013
 Fever Dream Part I and Fever Dream Part II, by Must Die!, 2013
 Fever Dreams, by Jamie N Commons, 2019

Songs
 "Fever Dream", by the Amity Affliction from Everyone Loves You... Once You Leave Them, 2020
 "Fever Dream", by Biffy Clyro from Balance, Not Symmetry, 2019
 "Fever Dream", by Bury Your Dead from Bury Your Dead, 2008
 "Fever Dream", by Frank Iero from Barriers, 2019
 "Fever Dream", by Heavy Heart from Keepsake, 2016
 "Fever Dream", by Iron & Wine from Our Endless Numbered Days, 2004
 "Fever Dream", by Loggins and Messina from Mother Lode, 1974
 "Fever Dream", by Momus from Vivid, 2020
 "Fever Dream", by More Than Skies from the soundtrack of the film The Space Between, 2017
 "Fever Dream", by Movements from Feel Something, 2017
 "Fever Dream", by mxmtoon from Dawn, 2020
 "Fever Dream", by Sarah Klang, 2021
 "Fever Dream", by Steve Vai from The Ultra Zone, 1999
 "Fever Dream", by Tangerine, 2017
 "Fever Dreams", by Circa Survive from Blue Sky Noise, 2010
 "Fever Dreams", by Dashboard Confessional from The Shade of Poison Trees, 2007
 "Fever Dreams", by Dio from Magica, 2000
 "Fever Dreams", by Hardline from Danger Zone, 2018

Other uses
 Fever Dreams, a podcast co-hosted by Will Sommer

See also
 Fevre Dream, a 1982 novel by George R. R. Martin
 
 Dream
 Nightmare
 False awakening
 Fever